César is a 1936 French film, written and directed by Marcel Pagnol. It is the final part of his Marseille trilogy, which began with the film Marius and was followed by Fanny. Unlike the other two films in the trilogy, César was not based on a play by Pagnol, but written directly as a film script. In 1946 Pagnol adapted the script as a stage play.

Plot

Honoré Panisse is dying, cheerfully, with friends, wife, and son at his side. He confesses to the priest in front of his friends; he insists that the doctor be truthful. But, he cannot bring himself to tell his son Césariot that his real father is Marius, the absent son of César, Césariot's godfather. Panisse leaves that to Fanny, the lad's mother. Dissembling that he's off to see a friend, Césariot then seeks Marius, now a mechanic in Toulon. Posing as a journalist, Césariot spends time with Marius and leaves believing tales that Marius is involved in burglary and drug trafficking. Only after the truth comes out can Marius, Fanny, César, and Césariot step beyond the falsehoods, benign though they may be.

Cast
Raimu as César Ollivier, bar owner
Pierre Fresnay as Marius Ollivier, son of César
Orane Demazis as Fanny Panisse, wife of Honoré 
Charpin as Honoré Panisse, husband of Fanny
André Fouche as Césariot Panisse, son of Fanny 
Alida Rouff as Honorine Cabanis, mother of Fanny  
Milly Mathis as Claudine Foulon, aunt of Fanny  
Robert Vattier as Adelbert Brun, retired customs official  
Paul Dullac as Félix Escartefique, retired ferry captain 
Marcel Maupi as Innocent Mangiapan, ferry stoker 
Édouard Delmont as Dr Félicien Venelle 
 Thommeray as Elzéar Bonnegrâce, parish priest

In popular culture
 The famed restaurateur and founder of California cuisine, Alice Waters, was so taken by this film that she named her Berkeley restaurant "Chez Panisse". The café upstairs from the restaurant is decorated with posters from the films Marius, Fanny, and César.
 The main characters from the films Marius, Fanny and César make a cameo appearance in the Asterix comic book Asterix and the Banquet.

References

External links
 
The Marseille Trilogy: Life Goes to the Movies an essay by Michael Atkinson at the Criterion Collection

1936 films
Films directed by Marcel Pagnol
1930s romantic comedy-drama films
1930s French-language films
French romantic comedy-drama films
French black-and-white films
Films set in Marseille
1936 comedy films
1936 drama films
1930s French films